Olwiyo is a town in Nwoya District in the Northern Region of Uganda.

Location
The coordinates of Olwiyo are 2°32'15.0"N, 31°53'06.0"E (Latitude:2.5375; Longitude:31.8850).

Power line
A  440 kilovolt electricity line from Karuma Power Station is under construction to a substation in Olwiyo, under the supervision of Intec Gopa International Energy Consultants GmbH of Germany.

See also
List of roads in Uganda
List of cities and towns in Uganda

References

External links

Populated places in Northern Region, Uganda
Cities in the Great Rift Valley
Nwoya District